Herbert Reginald Dauphin Gybbon-Monypenny CBE (1895–1988) was a British diplomat.

Biography
Born on 2 October 1895, Herbert Gybbon-Monypenny was educated at Bedford School. He entered the British Diplomatic Service and was Consul-General in Tunis, between 1943 and 1944, Oriental Counsellor at the British Embassy in Tehran, between 1944 and 1946, Consul-General in Frankfurt, between 1946 and 1951, Consul-General in Jerusalem, between 1951 and 1953, and British Ambassador to the Dominican Republic, between 1953 and 1955.

Herbert Gybbon-Monypenny was invested as a Commander of the Order of the British Empire in 1953. He retired from Her Majesty's Diplomatic Service in 1955 and died on 22 February 1988, aged 92.

References

1895 births
1988 deaths
People educated at Bedford School
Ambassadors of the United Kingdom to the Dominican Republic
Members of HM Diplomatic Service
Commanders of the Order of the British Empire
20th-century British diplomats